South River Peak, elevation , is a summit San Juan Mountains of southern Colorado.  The mountain is in the Weminuche Wilderness of Rio Grande National Forest.

Historical names
Macomb Peak
South River Peak – 1906

See also

List of mountain peaks of North America
List of mountain peaks of the United States
List of mountain peaks of Colorado

References

External links

Rio Grande National Forest (United States Forest Service)

Mountains of Mineral County, Colorado
North American 4000 m summits
San Juan Mountains (Colorado)
South River Peak